Bulekovsky is a rural locality (a khutor) in Rossoshinskoye Rural Settlement, Uryupinsky District, Volgograd Oblast, Russia. The population was 101 as of 2010.

Geography 
Bulekovsky is located in steppe, 35 km southwest of Uryupinsk (the district's administrative centre) by road. Podgorinsky is the nearest rural locality.

References 

Rural localities in Uryupinsky District